Bijî Serok Apo is a slogan used by sympathizers with Abdullah Öcalan, the leader of the Kurdistan Workers' Party (PKK) and can be translated into Long live leader Apo (Apo as abbreviation for Abdullah). Apo can be translated also into uncle. The slogan can lead to prosecution in Turkey and Germany.

History 
Its origin can be traced back to a concert at the University of Cologne, Germany from 11 May 1984 when Koma Berxwedan gave a concert in support of the PKK. The party organ Serxwebûn reported how at the end of the concert the crowd shouted Bijî Serok Apo. Since it has become a common slogan for Kurdish political activists. 

It has been present during the press conference in Batman, where politicians of the Democratic Society Party (DTP) read out a press statement on the 10th anniversary of the capture of Abdullah Öcalan. 

In 2014 it was shouted during a march against the terror designation of the PKK in Cologne, Germany. The phrase is also used by fighters of the Peoples' Defense Units (YPG). In 2016 at a Kurdish festival in Cologne with 30'000 attendants where the party Die Linke politician Bernd Riexinger and demanded Abdullah Öcalans freedom and peace negotiations, the slogan was also shouted. It is also often shouted during the annual Newroz celebrations in March in Diyarbakır, and Istanbul.

Prosecution

In Turkey 
In Turkey, the slogan can lead to a prison sentences and fines. The slogan is not prohibited per se, but is often viewed as showing support for the PKK by the Turkish authorities. In 2009 two Kurds were sentenced to a fine of 500 and 600 Turkish lira after having shouted the slogan during a press conference opposing the closure of the DTP. In December 2019, the European Court of human Rights ruled that the slogan is protected by Article 10 of the European Convention of Human rights which concerns on freedom of expression. In 2022, the former co-chair of the pro-Kurdish Peoples Democratic Party (HDP) Selahattin Demirtas was prosecuted for a tweet of 16 November 2013 in which he wrote Bijî Serok Apo.  In July the slogan was also shouted during the HDP congress in Ankara.

In Germany 
In Germany the slogan is at times not protected by the freedom of expression. Depending on the police, the slogan can lead to an investigation or can also be permitted. Its shouting can lead to a prosecution and fine.

References 

Political catchphrases
Kurdish language
Kurdish words and phrases